Broken English is a part of the East West Records family of labels.

See also 
 List of record labels

American record labels